Åre Östersund Airport , previously known as Östersund–Frösön Airport is located about 11 km (6.8 mi) west of Östersund, Sweden and 94 km (58 mi) east of Åre, Sweden. The airport opened in 1958.

Åre Östersund airport is an international airport and served 465,196 passengers in 2015.

Airlines and destinations
The following airlines operate regular scheduled and charter flights at Åre Östersund Airport:

Statistics 

{| class="wikitable" style="font-size: 90%" width=align=
|+ Countries with most handled passengers to/from Åre Östersund Airport (2019)|-
! Rank
! Country
! Passengers
! Change2018/19
|-
|1
|
| 10,705
|32.3%
|-
|2
|
| 9,346
|17.6%
|-
|3
|
| 3,118
|5.3%
|-
|4
|
| 2,702
|35,7%
|-
|5
|
| 2,504
|NEW
|-
|}

 Ground transportation 

 Bus 
Airport Coaches (Stadsbussarna'') departs from the airport to down town Östersund. In the winter, Åre Flygtransfer departs in connection with every SAS and BRA flight, to and from Åre.

Incidents and accidents
 On 9 September 2007 an MD83 took off for a charter flight bound for Antalya, Turkey. The plane was overloaded and left the runway very late and touched the landing light equipment that was placed outside the runway. It continued to Antalya where it landed normally.
 On 29 December 2019 an Easyjet A320 (G-EZWY) skidded off a taxiway, resulting in a 29-hour delay of the return flight to LGW as an engineering inspection was required

See also 
List of the busiest airports in the Nordic countries

References

External links

Airports in Sweden
Östersund
Buildings and structures in Jämtland County
1958 establishments in Sweden
Airports established in 1958
International airports in Sweden